Kashif Mumtaz Siddiqi (born 25 January 1986) is a professional footballer who plays as a defender. Born in England, Siddiqi represented Pakistan at senior international level.

After playing youth football with various teams in England, Siddiqi moved to the United States on a scholarship to play college soccer, before spending two seasons in the USL PDL, before moving to the Middle East to play.

In 2011, Siddiqi founded the Kashif Siddiqi Foundation, which aims to encourage young British Asians into the game. He is also an ambassador for Kick It Out, an anti-racism organisation.

Early and personal life
Kashif Mumtaz Siddiqi was born in Hammersmith to an Indian father and a Ugandan mother. He is Muslim.

In January 2012, Siddiqi was invited to the inaugural Asian Football Awards at Wembley Stadium, where he handed out the award for
Young Asian Player of the Year to Danny Batth.

In April 2012, Siddiqi was made an official ambassador for Chelsea's "Search for an Asian Star" campaign
2012, along with player Florent Malouda and Bhangra musicians Jaz Dhami and H Dhami. The 2012 edition of the tournament attracted 400 children.

Club career

Early career in England
Siddiqi played youth football for Arsenal, Wycombe Wanderers, Hayes, Yeading and Boston United.

College career
In 2005 Siddiqi played college soccer in the United States on a scholarship, while studying for a degree in Business Administration, attending Eckerd College in St. Petersburg, Florida for two years and Presbyterian College for one year. He then transferred to Fresno Pacific University for his last year to finish off his degree and play club football.

USL PDL career
In 2009 the USL Premier Development League began paying some players, and that same season Siddiqi signed to play with the Springfield Demize. He made his debut for the team in their 2009 season opener against Des Moines Menace, and spent the season as club captain. He spent the 2010 season with the Fresno Fuego, also in the USL PDL.

Later career and injuries
Siddiqi later played in the Middle East, for Al-Wasl of Dubai, before his career was interrupted by a number of serious injuries.

Return to the USL PDL
Siddiqi signed for the Ventura County Fusion for the 2012 season.

Return to England
Siddiqi signed for Football League club Northampton Town in September 2013, having trained with the club during the previous season, following his recovery from a hip injury.

In August 2019, he signed for Oxford United in a player/ambassadorial role, with the intention that he would join an Indian club on loan. In September 2019, he moved to Indian club Real Kashmir on loan. He missed the first two I-League games due to injury.

He was released at the end of the 2019–20 season.

International career
Siddiqi received his first national team call-up to the Pakistan under-23 team in May 2007 for the Beijing 2008 Olympic Qualifiers, making his debut against Bahrain, and playing in two further matches against Kuwait and Qatar. He was called back up to the under-23 team in 2010.

In 2008, he was called up by the senior team to take part in the SAFF Championship, and later that year he earned one full international cap. In March 2011, Siddiqi was named in the provisional 37-man squad for the upcoming AFC Challenge Cup qualifying matches.

Siddiqi has also played for the 'Pakistan XI', a team composed of Europe-based players of Pakistani origin which competes in friendly games.

Charity work
In 2011, Siddiqi founded the Kashif Siddiqi Foundation, with the aim to encourage increase the participation of British Asians in association football. Siddiqi has also attended meetings with the English Football Association on the matter. In April 2011, Siddiqi and the foundation played in a charity match to raise money for the Sodje Sports Foundation, Bury Hospice and The Bury Fusilier. He is also an ambassador for Kick It Out.

He is also the co-founder of the Football For Peace organization.

In November 2013, Siddiqi was honoured by Prince Albert II of Monaco for his charity work.

References

External links
 
 

1986 births
Living people
English people of Indian descent
British sportspeople of Indian descent
British Asian footballers
English people of Ugandan descent
English Muslims
English footballers
Arsenal F.C. players
Wycombe Wanderers F.C. players
Hayes F.C. players
Yeading F.C. players
Boston United F.C. players
Springfield Demize players
Fresno Fuego players
USL League Two players
Eckerd College alumni
Northampton Town F.C. players
Association football defenders
Footballers from Hammersmith
English expatriate sportspeople in the United States
Expatriate soccer players in the United States
English expatriate footballers
Oxford United F.C. players
Oxford United F.C. non-playing staff
Naturalised citizens of Pakistan
Pakistani footballers
Pakistan international footballers